The Great Central Railway in England was formed when the Manchester, Sheffield and Lincolnshire Railway changed its name in 1897, anticipating the opening in 1899 of its London Extension. On 1 January 1923, the company was grouped into the London and North Eastern Railway.

History

New name
Other lines linked Sheffield to Barnsley (via ) and Doncaster (via Rotherham) and also  and Wrawby Junction. Branch lines in north Lincolnshire ran to Barton-upon-Humber and New Holland and served ironstone quarries in the Scunthorpe area. In the Manchester area, lines ran to Stalybridge and Glossop.

In the 1890s, the MS&LR began constructing its Derbyshire lines, the first part of its push southwards. Leaving its east–west main line at Woodhouse Junction, some 5½ miles south-east of Sheffield, the line headed towards Nottingham, a golden opportunity to tap into colliery traffic in the north of the county before reaching the city. A loop line was built to serve its station in Chesterfield.

Coat of arms
The Great Central Railway was the first railway granted a coat of arms. It was granted on 25 February 1898 by the Garter, Clarenceux and Norroy Kings of Arms as:
Argent on a cross gules voided of the field between two wings in chief sable and as many daggers erect, in base of the second, in the fesse point a morion winged of the third, on a chief also of the second a pale of the first thereon eight arrows saltirewise banded also of the third, between on the dexter side three bendlets enhanced and on the sinister a fleur de lis or. And for the Crest on a Wreath of the Colours A representation of the front of a locomotive engine between two wings Or as the same are in the margin hereof more plainly depicted to be borne and used for ever hereafter by the said Corporation of the Great Central Railway Company on seals, shields, banners or otherwise according to the Laws of Arms.
The design included elements representing Manchester (gules ... three bendlets enhanced ... or); Sheffield (eight arrows saltirewise banded); Lincoln (gules ... a fleur de lis or); Leicester (two wings); and London (Argent ... a cross gules ... daggers erect). Also represented was Mercury (a morion winged [sable]). It was used on locomotives and coaches.

The London and North Eastern Railway and the British Transport Commission, successors of the GCR, were granted arms of their own incorporating the GCR motto Forward.

The Great Central Railway (1976) Company Limited applied to the College of Arms as the successors to British Transport Commission (Loughborough to Birstall Light Railway) for permission to utilise the Coat of Arms of the GCR. A new design incorporating the same armorial components, updated in the modern style was proposed, but was rejected in favour of the original.

The "London extension"

The MS&LR obtained parliamentary approval in 1893 for its extension to London. On 1 August 1897, the railway's name was changed to  Great Central Railway. Building work started in 1895, and the new line, 92 miles (147 km) in length, opened for coal traffic on 25 July 1898, for passenger traffic on 15 March 1899, and for goods traffic on 11 April 1899. It was designed for high-speed running throughout.

It is a commonly held myth that the nomenclature for the direction of travel on the new line was the opposite of standard UK railway practice, in that trains travelling to London were referred to as "down" trains, and those travelling away from the capital as "up" trains. It is supposed that it was a result of the GCR's headquarters at the time being in Manchester. The mileposts on the Great Central did start at zero at Manchester London Road and increase down the main line via Woodhead, Sheffield Victoria, Woodhouse, and then down the London Extension to Marylebone, 205 route miles from Manchester.

However, official documents dated 21 July 1898, detailing the method of working of mineral trains on the London Extension (used to help consolidate the new earthworks before passenger traffic began in March 1899), clearly show that the direction of travel on the new line was conventional – up to London, down to Annesley.  Furthermore, contemporary descriptions in newspapers of the trains running on the new line are explicit that up trains ran to London and down trains away from it. That made the Great Central unusual amongst British railways in that its down trains went towards its "milepost zero" and up trains went away from it, but the convention of up and down trains in relation to London was retained.

In 1903, new rails were laid parallel to the Metropolitan Railway from Harrow to the junction north of Finchley Road, enabling more traffic to use Marylebone.

Later history
In 1902, the company introduced an express service from Bournemouth and Southampton to York and Newcastle upon Tyne. A year later, it began a through running express from Dover and Folkestone to Leicester, Nottingham, Sheffield, Leeds, Huddersfield, Halifax, Bradford and Manchester, avoiding London and opening up the South Coast to the Midlands and the North. The route from Banbury to Reading was over Great Western track and from there it traversed South Eastern Railway track via Aldershot and Guildford to Redhill and on to Folkestone and Dover.
 
At the same time, the Great Central was gaining a reputation for fast services to and from London. Slip coaches were provided for passengers for Leicester and Nottingham.

On 2 April 1906, an "alternative main line" route from Grendon Underwood Junction near Aylesbury to Neasden in north-west London opened. The line was joint GCR/GWR between Ashendon Junction and Northolt Junction. It was built to increase traffic on the GCR by overcoming capacity constraints on the Metropolitan extension and as a result of disagreements between the MetR and GCR after the resignation of Sir Edward Watkin due to poor health. By the time the line was built, the companies had settled their differences.

On 1 January 1923, under the terms of the Railways Act 1921, the GCR amalgamated with several other railways to create the London and North Eastern Railway.

The GCR line was the last complete mainline railway to be built in Britain until section one of High Speed 1 opened in 2003 and was also one of the shortest-lived intercity railway lines. Yet in its early years, its steam-hauled Sheffield expresses were the fastest in the country.

Closure
The express services from London to destinations beyond Nottingham were withdrawn in 1960. The line was closed to passenger trains between Aylesbury and Rugby on 3 September 1966.

Line retention 
Since 1996, Chiltern Railways has used the Great Central lines south of Aylesbury for local services into London, including the alternative route south of Haddenham and widened lines south of Neasden for its intercity main line from Birmingham to London. None of these lines are currently electrified.

Work started in 2019 on developing East West Rail, which will extend passenger services north of Aylesbury Vale Parkway through  to meet a renewed  to  section of the old 'Varsity Line' just beyond the site of the former Great Central station at Calvert. Services are expected to start in the mid-2020s.

Acquisitions
The Lancashire, Derbyshire and East Coast Railway (LD&ECR) opened in 1897, to link the coalfields with deep-water ports, and was intended to run from Sutton-on-Sea in Lincolnshire to Warrington in Lancashire. In the event only the section between Pyewipe Junction, near Lincoln and Chesterfield Market Place station and some branch lines were built. It was purchased by the GCR on 1 January 1907, to provide a better link between the London main line and the east coast.
Wrexham, Mold and Connah's Quay Railway was purchased 1 January 1905.
North Wales and Liverpool Railway was acquired at the same time.
Wigan Junction Railway was bought on 1 January 1906, as was the Liverpool, St Helens and South Lancashire Railway
North Lindsey Light Railway Scunthorpe to Whitton opened throughout on 1 December 1910 and was worked by the GCR. It carried passengers, although its main freight was ironstone.

Joint working
Apart from the three branches in the Liverpool area, the GCR lines in the north of England were all east of Manchester but GCR trains could run from coast to coast by means of joint working with other railways. The largest of those utilized in this way were those under the Cheshire Lines Committee: the other participants were the Midland Railway and the Great Northern Railway, taking in both Liverpool and Southport. Other joint undertakings were (west to east):
Manchester, South Junction and Altrincham Railway (GCR/LNWR)
Oldham, Ashton and Guide Bridge Railway (GCR/LNWR)
Macclesfield, Bollington and Marple Railway (GCR/NSR); including its Hayfield branch
South Yorkshire Joint Railway (GCR, GNR, Lancashire and Yorkshire Railway, MR and North Eastern Railway)
Sheffield District Railway(GCR and MidR)
West Riding and Grimsby Joint Railway (GCR/GNR) - giving access to Wakefield and thence to Leeds
Hull and Barnsley and Great Central Joint Railway - opened 1916 for freight traffic only.

There were also joint lines in the south:
Aylesbury Station Joint Committee
Great Western and Great Central Joint Railway
Banbury Junction Railway
Metropolitan and Great Central Joint Railway
Watford Joint Railway

Key officers
For those in position before 1899, dates are as served for the MS&LR.

General Managers
1886–1902 Sir William Pollitt (knighted 1899, later Lord Stuart of Wortley)
1902–1922 Sir Samuel Fay (knighted 1912)

Locomotive Engineer
1894–1900 Harry Pollitt
1900–1902 John George Robinson

Chief Mechanical Engineer
1902–1922 John George Robinson, for whom the post was created

GCR locomotives

These could generally be divided into those intended for passenger work, especially those used on the London Extension and those for the heavy freight work.

See Locomotives of the Great Central Railway

Pollitt's locomotives
Taken over from the MS&LR, mainly of class F2, 2-4-2 tank locomotives, and also classes D5 and D6 4-4-0 locomotives.

Robinson locomotives
During Robinson's tenure, many of the larger express passenger engines came into being:
Classes B1-B9: 4-6-0 tender locomotives
Classes C4/5: 4-4-2 tender locomotives
Classes D9-11: 4-4-0 tender locomotives
Class J13: 0-6-0T
Classes L1/L3: 2-6-4T
Classes O4/5: 2-8-0, heavy freight locos, including ROD engines
GCR Class 8A (LNER Class Q4) 0-8-0 heavy freight locomotive
GCR Class 8H (LNER Class S1) 0-8-4T used at Wath marshalling yard

Preserved locomotives
Only two GCR locomotives are preserved:

In 2019 there were plans to build a replica steam locomotive - a GCR Class 2  (known as the LNER D7 Class) Numbered 567 at Ruddington.

Coaching stock
The following GCR coaches are preserved.

Wagons

Goods wagons and freight stock

Cranes

Major stations
London Marylebone
Manchester London Road

Wath marshalling yard

The marshalling yard at Wath-upon-Dearne opened in November 1907. It was designed to cope with coal trains, full and empty; it was worked with electro-pneumatic signalling.

Accidents and incidents

On 30 March 1889, an excursion train was derailed at Penistone, Yorkshire due to a failure of an axle on the locomotive hauling it. A mail train ran into the wreckage at low speed. One person was killed and 61 were injured.
Another express passenger train ran into the wreckage at low speed. Four people were killed.
On 2 February 1908, the driver of a freight train sneezed, his head collided with that of his fireman, knocking both of them out. Due to excessive speed, a van in the train derailed approaching  station, Yorkshire and the train overran signals there.
On 13 December 1911, a freight train ran away and was derailed at  station, Yorkshire. Both locomotive crew were killed.
About 1913, a coal train was derailed at Torside, Derbyshire. The crew of the locomotive may have been overcome by fumes in the Woodhead Tunnel.

Docks

Grimsby docks
Grimsby, dubbed the "largest fishing port in the world" in the early 20th century, owed its prosperity to the ownership by the GCR and its forebear, the MS&LR. Coal and timber were among its biggest cargoes. The port had two main docks: the Alexandra Dock (named for Queen Alexandra) and the Royal Dock which was completed in 1852, linked by the Union Dock. The total area of docks was 104.25 acres (42 ha).

Immingham Dock

Completed in 1912, this dock covered  and was mainly concerned with the movement of coal. On 22 July 2012, the docks held an open day to celebrate 100 years of operation.

Ships
The Great Central Railway operated a number of ships.

Immingham museum 
Immingham museum, which portrays the role of the Great Central Railway in the building of the docks and construction of the local rail network is home to the Great Central Railway Society archive. The museum is located in the Civic Centre, Pelham Road, Immingham and is open from 1pm to 4pm, Wednesday to Saturday from March through to November.

See also
Edward Chapman

Notes

References

External links

Lists of LNER locomotives, including those of the GCR taken over at grouping
Homepage of the Great Central Railway Society
Homepage of the Great Central Railway (Leicestershire)
Homepage of the Great Central Railway (Nottingham)
Homepage of Immingham Museum & Heritage Centre

 
Railway companies established in 1897
Railway companies disestablished in 1922
Pre-grouping British railway companies
London and North Eastern Railway constituents